Mahoba is a constituency of the Uttar Pradesh Legislative Assembly  covering the entire sub-district of Mahoba and part of Charkhari sub-district in the Mahoba district of Uttar Pradesh, India.
  
Mahoba is one of five assembly constituencies in the Hamirpur Lok Sabha constituency. Since 2008, this assembly constituency is numbered 230 amongst 403 constituencies.

Election results

2022

2017
Bharatiya Janta Party candidate Rakesh Kumar Goswami won in 2017 Uttar Pradesh Legislative Elections defeating Samajwadi Party candidate Siddh Gopal Sahu by a margin of 31,387 votes.

References

External links
 

Assembly constituencies of Uttar Pradesh
Mahoba